Trois: The Escort (also known as Trois 3: The Escort) is a 2004 erotic thriller directed by Skav One and starring Brian White, Patrice Fisher, Reagan Gomez-Preston and Isaiah Washington. The film was released direct-to-DVD by Columbia TriStar Home Entertainment on December 28, 2004. It is the sequel to 2002's Trois 2: Pandora's Box and the third movie in the Trois film series.

Synopsis

Trenton Meyer is an intelligent, but naive college student turned hip-hop promoter who gets a little more than what he had bargained for when a failed hip-hop concert goes south. Trent turns to the world of male prostitution to pay what he owes to an underworld figure. Meanwhile, in this life of prostitution, he falls for a colleague, who turns out to be a femme fatale.

Cast
 Brian White as Trenton "Trent" Meyer
 Patrice Fisher as Kyria Bynam
 Reagan Gomez-Preston as Lena
 Isaiah Washington as Bernard "Benny" Grier
 Bone Crusher as Cognac
 Donna Biscoe as Patricia Meyer
 Lou Walker as Wendell Meyer

References

External links
 

African-American films
2000s erotic thriller films
Films about male prostitution in the United States
Films set in Atlanta
2004 directorial debut films
2004 films
American erotic thriller films
Direct-to-video sequel films
Films produced by Will Packer
Films directed by Sylvain White
Rainforest Films films
2000s English-language films
2000s American films